The National Sports Collectors Convention is an annual trade show held in the United States devoted to sports memorabilia. Also known as The National, the convention has been held annually since 1980 when a small handful of sports card collectors convened at a hotel located adjacent to the Los Angeles International Airport.  It is considered to be among the largest and most well known sports collector shows, and the 2021 show drew approximately 100,000 attendees.

References

External links
 Official site

Baseball cards
Sports memorabilia
Recurring events established in 1980
1980 establishments in the United States
Trade shows in the United States